Mollie Sweetser was an American politician from Reading, Massachusetts. She represented the 18th Middlesex district in the Massachusetts House of Representatives from 1933 to 1936.

References

Year of birth missing
Year of death missing
Members of the Massachusetts House of Representatives
Women state legislators in Massachusetts